Ijrud-e Pain Rural District is in Halab District of Ijrud County, Zanjan province, Iran. At the National Census of 2006, its population was 5,513 in 1,460 households. There were 5,671 inhabitants in 1,896 households at the following census of 2011. At the most recent census of 2016, the population of the rural district was 5,192 in 1,717 households. The largest of its 43 villages was Nakatu, with 606 people.

References 

Ijrud County

Rural Districts of Zanjan Province

Populated places in Zanjan Province

Populated places in Ijrud County